Kynogon was a computer software company that provided AI middleware to the video game and the simulation industries. The company was acquired by Autodesk in February 2008, and its flagship product was titled Autodesk Navigation. Autodesk ended the sale of Navigation in July 2017.

History
Kynogon was founded in France in 2000 by Pierre Pontevia and Jacques Gaubil. It also has offices in Montreal, Quebec, Canada, and the UK. Kynogon has won many awards such as Red Herring 100 or Develop Industry Excellence.

Kynogon partners
In the video game domain, Kynogon maintains partnerships with console makers (Microsoft, Sony and Nintendo). Kynogon is a member of Epic Games's integrated partner program and Kynapse is available as integrated into the Unreal Engine. Kynogon also works with other complementary middleware developers (Ageia, Emergent Game Technologies, Trinigy).

In the simulation industry, Kynogon partners with MAK Technologies and is the developer of BHave, a plug-in to VR-Forces CGF.

References

External links
Kynogon site

Software companies of France
Autodesk acquisitions